Harold Dean (20 February 1913 – 28 February 1997) was a Queensland politician, and served as the member for Sandgate for the Labor from 1960 to 1977.

References

Members of the Queensland Legislative Assembly
1913 births
1997 deaths
Australian Labor Party members of the Parliament of Queensland
20th-century Australian politicians